David Low may refer to:

 David Low (bishop) (1768–1855), cleric of the Scottish Episcopal Church 
 David Low (cartoonist) (1891–1963), New Zealand political cartoonist and caricaturist who lived and worked in the United Kingdom 
 David Low (agriculturalist) (1786–1859), Scottish agriculturalist
 G. David Low (1956–2008), astronaut from the United States
 Dave Low (1887–1916), Australian rules footballer
 David Low (politician) (1911–1974), Australian politician from Queensland 
 David Low (footballer) (born 1983), Singaporean footballer
 D. M. Low (David Morrice Low, 1890–1972), British academic

See also
David Lowe (disambiguation)